Air Atlantic was a Canadian airline, operating a fleet of BAe 146-200, BAe 4100 and Dash 8-100 aircraft.

Founded and majority owned by Craig Dobbin, Air Atlantic was established in 1986 and operated Dash 7 aircraft as an interim solution until delivery of their first Dash 8's. Air Atlantic functioned as a feeder airline for Canadian Pacific Airlines and later Canadian Airlines International throughout Atlantic Canada and offered limited service from that region to Quebec, Ontario and New England. It ceased operations in October 1998.

Destinations

Canada
 New Brunswick
 Charlo - Charlo Airport
 Fredericton - Fredericton International Airport
 Miramichi - Miramichi Airport
 Moncton - Greater Moncton International Airport
 Saint John - Saint John Airport
 Newfoundland and Labrador
 Churchill Falls - Churchill Falls Airport
 Deer Lake - Deer Lake Regional Airport
 Gander - Gander International Airport
 Goose Bay - CFB Goose Bay
 Stephenville - Stephenville International Airport
 St. John's - St. John's International Airport
 Wabush - Wabush Airport
 Nova Scotia
 Halifax - Halifax Stanfield International Airport
 Sydney - Sydney/J.A. Douglas McCurdy Airport
 Yarmouth - Yarmouth Airport
 Ontario
 Ottawa - Ottawa Macdonald–Cartier International Airport
 Toronto - Toronto Pearson International Airport
 Toronto - Buttonville Municipal Airport
 Prince Edward Island
 Charlottetown - Charlottetown Airport
 Québec
 Montréal - Montréal–Pierre Elliott Trudeau International Airport
 Québec City - Québec City Jean Lesage International Airport
 Iles-de-Madeleine - Îles-de-la-Madeleine Airport

United States
 Bangor - Bangor International Airport
 Boston - Logan International Airport
 Portland - Portland International Jetport

See also 
 List of defunct airlines of Canada

References

External links

Defunct airlines of Canada

Regional airlines of Atlantic Canada
Defunct companies of Newfoundland and Labrador